Taras Kryvyi (born December 24, 1995) is a Ukrainian footballer playing with FC Ukraine United in the Ontario Soccer League.

Playing career 
Kryvyi began his career in 2012 with FC Ternopil in the Ukrainian Football Amateur League. In 2012, he assisted in securing promotion to the Ukrainian Second League. While in 2014 the team secured promotion to the Ukrainian First League. After Ternopil was relegated in 2017, he returned to the Ukrainian Football Amateur League to play with Nyva Terebovila. Shortly after he returned to the Ukrainian Second League to sign with Nyva Ternopil. 

In 2019, he played abroad in the Canadian Soccer League with FC Ukraine United. He played in the Ontario Soccer League in 2021 with Ukraine United.

References 

Living people
1995 births
Ukrainian footballers
FC Ternopil players
FC Nyva Ternopil players
FC Ukraine United players
Ukrainian First League players
Canadian Soccer League (1998–present) players
Association football midfielders
Ukrainian Second League players